Maria Aleksandrovna Voronina (born February 18, 2000, in Obninsk) is a  Russian  beach volleyball player.   She is a  Youth Olympic champion 2018  with Maria Bocharova.

Career
Voronina was a member of the Obninsk beach volleyball school for eight years and she was coached under Elena Masalyova.

Voronina and her teammate Maria Bocharova won the European Junior Championships U18 and U20 in 2017 and in 2018 they  won the FIVB Beach Volleyball U19 World Championships.

At 2018 Summer Youth Olympics the Voronina–Bocharova duet made it to the final, they beat a couple from Italy Scampoli–Bertozzi (21:19, 21:19) and won the championship.

At 2019 Beach Volleyball U21 World Championship the Voronina–Bocharova duet made it to the final, but lost to a couple from Brazil Victoria-Vitoria in a difficult dramatic tie-break match:

Russia-Brazil(1-2(21-17;15-21;13-15)) It was the first major failure.

References

External links

 
 
 
 Maria Voronina on Obninsk News

2000 births
Living people
People from Obninsk
Russian beach volleyball players
Russian women's volleyball players
Beach volleyball players at the 2018 Summer Youth Olympics
Youth Olympic gold medalists for Russia
Sportspeople from Kaluga Oblast
21st-century Russian women